Bucculatrix agilis is a moth species in the  family Bucculatricidae. It was first described by Edward Meyrick in 1920 and is found in South Africa.

It has been recorded feeding on Acacia horrida.

References

External links
Natural History Museum Lepidoptera generic names catalog

Endemic moths of South Africa
Bucculatricidae
Moths described in 1920
Taxa named by Edward Meyrick
Moths of Africa